The 2018 Sibiu Cycling Tour is a cycling stage race that took place between 5 and 8 July 2018 in and around Sibiu, Romania.

In 2018 the race returned to the format last used in 2014 with four days of racing including two mountain top finishes. There were two stages on the final day including the return of the team time trial.

Teams
The peloton featured three Professional Continental Teams, 14 Continental Teams and two national teams.

Route
The race route was announced in December 2017.

Stages

Prologue
5 July 2017 — Sibiu to Sibiu, individual time trial (ITT)

Raced over a technical  with 20 corners and several cobbled sections, the stage was won by Italian Davide Ballerini who would be the only rider to finish in under 3 minutes.

Stage 1
6 July 2017 — Sibiu to Balea Lac, 

For the second year in a row, there was a Colombian victory on the slopes of Balea Lac. With five kilometres remaining in the stage Iván Sosa attacked a depleted peloton of 15-20 riders. Initially, two riders, Maxim Rusnac and Amaro Antunes remained with him, but with a second attack he shook off the other contenders and rode to a solo victory.

Stage 2
7 July 2017 — Sibiu to Paltinis, 

Stage 2 was expected to be a  mountain stage to the resort of Paltanis. Despite setting off in bright conditions, after  the race was engulfed by a storm that saw rain, hail, thunder and lightning, with visibility at less than 20 metres and with police unable to maintain road closures. In coordination with the race organisers, the jury decided to apply the UCI Extreme Weather Protocol, declaring the stage null and void in accordance with article 2.2.029 of the UCI rulebook.

Stage 3a
8 July 2017 — Cisnadie to Sibiu, Team time trial,

Stage 3b
8 July 2017 — Sibiu to Sibiu,

Classification leadership table
In the 2018 Sibiu Cycling Tour, six different jerseys are awarded of which four are worn in the race. The most important is the general classification, which is calculated by adding each cyclist's finishing times on each stage. Time bonuses are awarded to the first three finishers on all stages with the exception of the time trial: the stage winner won a ten-second bonus, with six and four seconds for the second and third riders respectively. Bonus seconds were also awarded to the first three riders at intermediate sprints; three seconds for the winner of the sprint, two seconds for the rider in second and one second for the rider in third. The rider with the least accumulated time is the race leader, identified by a yellow jersey. This classification is considered the most important of the 2017 Sibiu Cycling Tour, and the winner of the classification is considered the winner of the race.

There is also a mountains classification, the leadership of which is marked by a white jersey. In the mountains classification, points towards the classification are won by reaching the top of a climb before other cyclists. Each climb is categorised as either category SA, A, B or C, with more points available for the higher-categorised climbs.

The third jersey represents the young rider classification, marked by an orange jersey. This is decided the same way as the general classification, but only riders born on or after 1 January 1995 are eligible to be ranked in the classification.

The fourth classification is the sprints classification, the leader of which is awarded a blue jersey. In the sprints classification, riders receive points for finishing in the top three at intermediate sprint points during each stage – awarded on a 3–2–1 scale – and these intermediate sprints also offer bonus seconds towards the general classification as noted above.

Additionally, there is a points classification, which awards a green jersey but that jersey is not represented in the race and only present on the podium. In the points classification, cyclists receive points for finishing in the top 15 in a stage, and unlike in the points classification in the Tour de France, the winners of all stages (with the exception of the prologue) are awarded the same number of points. For winning a stage, a rider earns 25 points, with 20 for second, 16 for third, 14 for fourth, 12 for fifth, 10 for sixth with a point fewer per place down to a single point for 15th place.

The sixth and final jersey represents the classification for Romanian riders, marked by a red jersey. This is decided the same way as the general classification, but only riders born in Romania are eligible to be ranked in the classification. Like the points jersey this is only present on the podium and is not worn in race

There are also awards for the team classification, in which the times of the best three cyclists per team on each stage are added together; the leading team at the end of the race is the team with the lowest total time.

Notes

References

External links 

 

2018 UCI Europe Tour
2018 in Romanian sport
UCI Europe Tour races
Cycle races in Romania